Sindaebangsamgeori Station is a station on the Seoul Subway Line 7.

Station layout

Metro stations in Dongjak District
Seoul Metropolitan Subway stations
Railway stations opened in 2000